Weregild (also spelled wergild, wergeld (in archaic/historical usage of English), weregeld, etc.), also known as man price (blood money), was a precept in some archaic legal codes whereby a monetary value was established for a person's life, to be paid as a fine or as compensatory damages to the person's family if that person was killed or injured by another.

Overview 
A weregild was a defined value placed on every man graded according to rank, used as a basis of a fine or compensation for murder, disablement, injury (or certain other serious crimes) against that person. It was assessed from the guilty party, payable as restitution to the victim's family.

The weregild was codified, for example, under Frankish Salic Code.

Weregild payment was an important legal mechanism in early Germanic society; the other common form of legal reparation at this time was blood revenge. The payment was typically made to the family or to the clan. Similar to the way a payment was made to family, it was also a family or kin group responsibility to ensure the payment for the wrong committed, especially if the offender is unable to cover the cost of the offense himself.

No distinction was made between murder and manslaughter until these distinctions were instituted by the re-introduction of Roman law in the 12th century.

Payment of the weregild was gradually replaced with capital punishment due to Christianization, starting around the 9th century, and almost entirely by the 12th century when weregild began to cease as a practice throughout the Holy Roman Empire.

Weregild from Norðleoda Laga:

Etymology and related concepts 

The word weregild is composed of were, meaning "man", and geld, meaning "payment or fee", as in Danegeld. Geld or Jeld was the Old English and Old Frisian word for "payment"; in numerous modern Germanic languages such as Dutch, Frisian, German and Afrikaans, it survives as the word for "money." The Danish word gæld and Norwegian gjeld both mean "debt". "-Gäld" is also a constituent of some Swedish words, having the same meaning: e.g. återgälda (retribute, return favour), gengäld (in return/exchange), vedergälda (revenge), and the formal/legal term gäldenär (geldeneer, referring to someone who is indebted). The word survives in English in the word "yield"; an equivalent reconstruction in Modern English of the term would therefore be *man-payment (according to meaning) or *wereyield (according to etymology).

The same concept outside Germanic culture is known as blood money. Words include ericfine in Ireland, galanas in Wales, veriraha in Finnish, vira ("вира") in Russia and główszczyzna in Poland.

The comparable tradition of diyya plays a role in the contemporary legal systems of Saudi Arabia, the United Arab Emirates, Iran and Pakistan.

Amount 

The size of the weregild was largely conditional upon the social rank of the victim. There used to be something of a "basis" fee for a standard "free man" that could then be multiplied according to the social rank of the victim and the circumstances of the crime. The weregild for women relative to that of men of equal rank varied: among the Saxons half that of men.

In the Migration period, the standard weregild for a freeman appears to have been 200 solidi (shillings), an amount reflected as the basic fee due for the death of a churl (or ceorl) both in later Anglo-Saxon and continental law codes.

In the 8th century, the Lex Alamannorum sets the weregild for a duke or archbishop at three times the basic value (600 shillings), while the killing of a low ranking cleric was fined with 300, raised to 400 if the cleric was attacked while he was reading mass.

During the reign of Charlemagne, his missi dominici required three times the regular weregild should they be killed whilst on a mission from the king.

In 9th century Mercian law a regular freeman (churl) was worth 200 shillings (twyhyndeman), and a nobleman was worth 1,200 (twelfhyndeman), a division established enough that two centuries later a charter of King Cnut's would simply refer to "all his people - the twelve-hundreders and the two-hundreders". The law code even mentions the weregild for a king, at 30,000 thrymsas, composed of 15,000 for the man, paid to the royal family, and 15,000 for the kingship, paid to the people. An archbishop or nobleman is likewise valued at 15,000 thrymsas. The weregild for a Welshman was 120 shillings if he owned at least one hide of land and was able to pay the king's tribute. If he has only 1 hide and cannot pay the tribute, his wergild was 80 shillings and then 70 if he was landless yet free.

Thralls and slaves legally commanded no weregild, but it was commonplace to make a nominal payment in the case of a thrall and the value of the slave in such a case. Technically this amount cannot be called a weregild, because it was more akin to a reimbursement to the owner for lost or damaged property.

In literature

Medieval
A classic example of a dispute over the weregild of a slave is contained in Iceland's Egil's Saga.

In the Völsunga saga or Saga of the Volsungs, the Æsir (Odin, Loki and Hœnir) are asked to pay weregild for killing Otr, son of Hreidmar. Otr is a "great fisherman"  and resembles an otter. He is 'eating a salmon and half dozing' on the river banks of Andvari's Falls when Loki kills him by throwing a stone at him. Later that evening, the Æsir visit Hreidmar's house where they are seized and imposed with a fine. Their fine consists of "filling the [Otr] skin with gold and covering the outside with red gold." Loki is sent to get the gold and he manages to trick the dwarf Andvari into giving him the gold as well as a curse ring: "The dwarf went into the rock and said that the gold ring would be the death of whoever owned it, and the same applied to all the gold."

In the Story of Grettir the Strong, chapter 27, "The Suit for the Slaying of Thorgils Makson", Thorgeir conveys to court Thorgils Arison's offer of weregild as atonement for killing Thorgils Makson.

In the Old English epic poem Beowulf, lines 156-158 Grendel refuses to settle his killings with payment or recompense, and at lines 456-472, Hroðgar recalls the story of how Ecgþeow (Beowulf's father) once came to him for help, for he had slain Heaðolaf, a man from another tribe called the Wulfings, and either could not pay the wergild or they refused to accept it. Hroðgar had married Wealhþeow, who probably belonged to the Wulfing tribe, and was able to use his kinship ties to persuade the Wulfings to accept the wergild and end the feud.  Hroðgar sees Beowulf's offer as a son's gratitude for what Hroðgar had done for Beowulf's father.

Modern
In the novel The Lord of the Rings by J. R. R. Tolkien, the journal of Isildur reveals that he justified taking the One Ring as a weregild for the deaths of his father (Elendil) and brother (Anárion) in battle.  Appendix A of The Return of the King also mentions a rich weregild of gold sent by Túrin II, Steward of Gondor, to King Folcwine of Rohan, after the death of his twin sons, Folcred and Fastred, in battle in Ithilien.

In Jim Butcher's Dresden Files novel Skin Game, Harry Dresden offers John Marcone a cashbox of diamonds as weregild for an employee murdered by Deirdre. Dresden says "That's for your dead employee's family. Take care of them with it. And leave my people out of it. It ends here."

In Rick Riordan's novel The Hammer of Thor, Hearthstone, an elf, must pay a wergild for his brother Andiron's death when they were children. Hearthstone, the older brother, was distracted and playing with rocks when a Brunnmigi emerged from a well and killed Andiron. Since Hearthstone was deaf, he didn't notice until it was too late. Hearthstone was forced by their father to skin the large beast by himself, which was turned into a rug and placed on the floor of his room. To pay his wergild, he had to cover every single hair with gold earned from his father, generally by doing chores. Every meal and any free time, among other things, cost Hearthstone earned gold. This task wasn't accomplished until years later, and his father, Alderman, was reluctant to consider the debt paid, but finally conceded that Hearthstone was released from the debt.

See also

 Anglo-Saxon law
 Beot
 Blood feud
 Blood law
 Blood libel
 Blood money
 Danegeld
 Diyya
 Éraic
 Feud
 Galanas
 Germanic law
 Główszczyzna
 Kanun
 Leges inter Brettos et Scottos
 Leibzoll
 Lex Frisionum
 Religious minority
 Sklavenkasse
 Tallage
 Tribalism
 Value of life
 Wrongful death

References

Sources
 Byock, Jesse L. (1990) Saga of the Volsungs. University of California Press. .
 Rabin, Andrew, The Political Writings of Archbishop Wulfstan of York (Manchester, 2015).

Early Germanic law
6th century in law
11th century in law
Slavery in England
Compensation for victims of crime